Jan Hackaert (1628–1685) was a Dutch Golden Age painter.

Biography
He travelled in Germany and Switzerland, and painted and sketched mostly landscapes. He would sketch miners at work in the mountains, and on more than one occasion this caused him trouble because the workers couldn't understand what he was doing. They felt he was either a spy or hexing them and made a complaint. Because Italianate landscapes were so fashionable, his Lake Zurich was mistaken for an Italian lake for years.

He painted the landscape backgrounds for other painters, such as Nicolas Berchem and Adriaen van de Velde.

References

External links 

1628 births
1685 deaths
Dutch Golden Age painters
Dutch male painters
Painters from Amsterdam